Carole Vergne (born August 7, 1985, in Saint-Malo, Ille-et-Vilaine) is a French sabre fencer. She won two medals, silver and bronze, in the same weapon at the 2009 World Fencing Championships in Antalya, Turkey.

Vergne represented France at the 2008 Summer Olympics in Beijing, where she competed in two sabre events. For her first event, the women's individual sabre, Vergne received a bye for the preliminary round of thirty-two, before losing out to South Korea's Kim Keum-Hwa, with a sudden death score of 14–15. Few days later, she joined with her fellow fencers and teammates Solenn Mary, Léonore Perrus, and Anne-Lise Touya for the women's team sabre. Vergne and her team, however, lost the bronze medal match to the U.S. team (led by Mariel Zagunis), with a total score of 38 touches.

References

External links
Profile – FIE
Profile – French Olympic Committee 
EuroFencing Profile
NBC Olympics Profile

1985 births
Living people
Sportspeople from Saint-Malo
French female sabre fencers
Olympic fencers of France
Fencers at the 2008 Summer Olympics
Mediterranean Games gold medalists for France
Mediterranean Games medalists in fencing
Competitors at the 2009 Mediterranean Games
21st-century French women